The Men's 400 Individual Medley (or "I.M.") at the 10th FINA World Swimming Championships (25m) was swum on 16 December 2010 in Dubai, United Arab Emirates. 35 individuals swam in the Preliminary heats of the event in the morning, with the top-8 finishers advancing on the Final that evening.

At the start of the event, the existing World (WR) and Championship records (CR) were:

The following records were established during the competition:

Results

Heats

Final

References

Individual medley 400 metre, Men's
World Short Course Swimming Championships